Heraklion or Iraklion (() is the largest city and the administrative capital of the island of Crete and capital of Heraklion regional unit. It is the fourth largest city in Greece with a population of 211,370 (Urban Area) according to the 2011 census. The population of the municipality was 177,064.

The Bronze Age palace of Knossos, also known as the Palace of Minos, is located 5.5 km (3.1m) southeast of the city.

Heraklion was Europe's fastest growing tourism destination for 2017, according to Euromonitor, with an 11.2% growth in international arrivals. According to the ranking, Heraklion was ranked as the 20th most visited region in Europe, as the 66th area on the planet and as the 2nd in Greece for the year 2017, with 3.2 million visitors and the 19th in Europe for 2018, with 3.4 million visitors.

Etymology

The Arab traders from al-Andalus (Iberia) who founded the Emirate of Crete moved the island's capital from Gortyna to a new castle they called rabḍ al-ḫandaq ("Castle of the Moat") in the 820s. This was hellenized as Χάνδαξ (Chándax) or Χάνδακας (Chándakas) and Latinized as Candia, which was taken into other European languages: in Italian and Latin as Candia, in French as Candie, in English as Candy, all of which could refer to the island of Crete as a whole as well as to the city alone; the Ottoman name was Kandiye.

After the Byzantine reconquest of Crete, the city was locally known as Megalo Kastro ('Big Castle' in Greek) and its inhabitants were called Kastrinoi (Καστρινοί, "castle-dwellers").

The ancient name Ηράκλειον was revived in the 19th century and comes from the nearby Roman port of Heracleum ("Heracles's city"), whose exact location is unknown.

History

Minoan era

Heraklion is close to the ruins of the palace of Knossos, which in Minoan times was the largest centre of population on Crete. Knossos had a port at the site of Heraklion (in the Poros-Katsambas neighborhood) from the beginning of the Early Minoan period (3500 to 2100 BC). Between 1600 and 1525 BC, the port was destroyed by a volcanic tsunami from nearby Santorini, leveling the region and covering it with ash.

Antiquity

After the fall of the Minoans, Heraklion, as well as the rest of Crete in general, fared poorly, with very little development in the area. Only with the arrival of the Romans did some construction in the area begin, yet especially early into Byzantine times the area abounded with pirates and bandits.

Emirate of Crete

The present city of Heraklion was founded in 824 by the Arabs under Abu Hafs Umar who had been expelled from Al-Andalus by Emir Al-Hakam I and had taken over the island from the Eastern Roman Empire. They built a moat around the city for protection, and named the city rabḍ al-ḫandaq (ربض الخندق, "Castle of the Moat", hellenized as Χάνδαξ, Chandax). It became the capital of the Emirate of Crete (ca. 827–961). The Saracens allowed the port to be used as a safe haven for pirates who operated against Imperial (Byzantine) shipping and raided Imperial territory around the Aegean.

Byzantine era

In 960, Byzantine forces under the command of Nikephoros Phokas, later to become Emperor, landed in Crete and attacked the city. After a prolonged siege, the city fell in March 961. The Saracen inhabitants were slaughtered, the city looted and burned to the ground. Soon rebuilt, the town remained under Byzantine control for the next 243 years.

Venetian era
 

In 1204, the city was bought by the Republic of Venice as part of a complicated political deal which involved, among other things, the Crusaders of the Fourth Crusade restoring the deposed Eastern Roman Emperor Isaac II Angelus to his throne. The Venetians improved on the ditch of the city by building enormous fortifications, most of which are still in place, including a giant wall, in places up to 40 m thick, with 7 bastions, and a fortress in the harbour. Chandax was renamed Candia and became the seat of the Duke of Candia, and the Venetian administrative district of Crete became known as "Regno di Candia" (Kingdom of Candia). The city retained the name of Candia for centuries and the same name was often used to refer to the whole island of Crete as well. To secure their rule, the Venetians began in 1212 to settle families from Venice on Crete. The coexistence of two different cultures and the stimulus of the Italian Renaissance led to a flourishing of letters and the arts in Candia and Crete in general, that is today known as the Cretan Renaissance.

Ottoman era

During the Cretan War (1645–1669), the Ottomans besieged the city for 21 years, from 1648 to 1669, the longest siege in history up until that time. In its final phase, which lasted for 22 months, 70,000 Turks, 38,000 Cretans and slaves and 29,088 of the city's Christian defenders perished. The Ottoman army under an Albanian grand vizier, Köprülü Fazıl Ahmed Pasha conquered the city in 1669.

Under the Ottomans, Kandiye (Ottoman Turkish قنديه) was the capital of Crete (Girit Eyâleti) until 1849, when Chania (Hanya) became the capital, and Kandiye became a sancak. In Greek, it was commonly called Megalo Castro (Μεγάλο Κάστρο 'Big Castle').

During the Ottoman period, the harbour silted up, so most shipping shifted to Chania in the west of the island.

Modern era
An earthquake located off the northern coast of Crete on October 12, 1856, destroyed most of the over 3,600 homes in the city. Only 18 homes were left intact. The disaster claimed 538 victims in Heraklion.

In 1898, the autonomous Cretan State was created, under Ottoman suzerainty, with Prince George of Greece as its High Commissioner and under international supervision. During the period of direct occupation of the island by the Great Powers (1898–1908), Candia was part of the British zone. At this time, the city was renamed "Heraklion", after the Roman port of Heracleum ("Heracles' city"), whose exact location is unknown.

In 1913, with the rest of Crete, Heraklion was incorporated into the Kingdom of Greece. Heraklion became again capital of Crete in 1971, replacing Chania.

Architecture, urban sculpture and fortifications

Venetian constructions such as the Koules Fortress (Castello a Mare), the ramparts and the arsenal dominate the port area.

Several sculptures, statues and busts commemorating significant events and figures of the city's and island's history, like El Greco, Vitsentzos Kornaros, Nikos Kazantzakis and Eleftherios Venizelos can be found around the city.

Many fountains of the Venetian era are preserved, such as the Bembo fountain, the Priuli fountain, Palmeti fountain, Sagredo fountain and Morosini fountain (in Lions Square).

After the St Titus Cathedral, the two largest medieval churches in the city were San Salvatore, belonging to the Augustinian Friars, and San Francesco, belonging to the Franciscans. San Salvatore stood in Kornaros Square and was demolished in 1970.

Around the historic city center of Heraklion there are also a series of defensive walls, bastions and other fortifications which were built earlier in the Middle Ages, but were completely rebuilt by the Republic of Venice. The fortifications managed to withstand the longest siege in history for 21 years, before the city fell to the Ottomans in 1669.

Municipality

The municipality Heraklion was formed at the 2011 local government reform by the merger of the following 5 former municipalities, that became municipal units:

Gorgolainis
 Heraklion
Nea Alikarnassos
Paliani
Temenos

The municipality has an area of 244.613 km2, the municipal unit 109.026 km2.

Neighborhoods

Suburbs

Transportation

Port

Heraklion is an important shipping port and ferry dock. Travellers can take ferries and boats from Heraklion to destinations including Santorini, Ios Island, Paros, Mykonos, and Rhodes. There are direct ferries to Naxos, Karpathos, Kasos, Sitia, Anafi, Chalki and Diafani. There are also several daily ferries to Piraeus, the port of Athens in mainland Greece. The port of Heraklion was built by Sir Robert McAlpine and completed in 1928.

Airport
The airport is named after Heraklion native Nikos Kazantzakis, a writer and a philosopher. It is the second busiest airport of Greece after Athens International Airport, first in charter flights and the 59th busiest in Europe, because of Crete being a major holiday destination with 8,066,000 passengers in 2022 (List of the busiest airports in Europe).

The airfield is shared with the 126th Combat Group of the Hellenic Air Force.

Highway network
European route E75 runs through the city and connects Heraklion with the three other major cities of Crete: Agios Nikolaos, Chania, and Rethymno.

Public transit

Urban buses serving the city, with 39 different routes. Intercity buses connects Heraklion to many major destinations in Crete.

Railway
From 1922 to 1937, a working industrial railway connected the Koules in Heraklion to Xiropotamos for the construction of the harbor.

In the summer of 2007, at the Congress of Cretan emigrants, held in Heraklion, two qualified engineers, George Nathenas (from Gonies, Malevizi Province) and Vassilis Economopoulos, recommended the development of a railway line in Crete, linking Chania, Rethymno and Heraklion, with a total journey time of 50 minutes (30 minutes between Heraklion and Rethymno, 20 minutes from Chania to Rethymno) and with provision for extensions to Kissamos, Kastelli Pediados (for the planned new airport), and Agios Nikolaos. No plans exist for implementing this idea.

Climate
Heraklion has a hot-summer-Mediterranean climate (Csa in the Köppen climate classification). Summers are warm to hot and dry with clear skies. Dry hot days are often relieved by seasonal breezes. Winters are very mild with moderate rain. Because Heraklion is further south than Athens, it has a warmer climate during winter but cooler during summer because of the Aegean sea. The maximum temperature during the summer period is usually not more than 28 - 30 °C (Athens normal maximum temperature is about 5 °C higher). The minimum temperature record is -0.8 °C
A new temperature record for February was set at 27.8 °C, reached on 15 February 2016.

Colleges, universities, libraries, and research centers

 University of Crete
 Hellenic Mediterranean University (HMU) (Former TEI)
 MBS College
 Foundation for Research & Technology - Hellas
 Nicolas Kitsikis Library
 Vikelaia Library

Culture

Museums
 Heraklion Archaeological Museum
 Cretaquarium
 Historical Museum of Crete
 Natural History Museum
 The Battle of Crete and National Resistance Museum
 Nikos Kazantzakis Museum
 Collection of Agia Aikaterini of Sinai
 Museum of Visual Arts

Arts
The Cultural and Conference Center of Heraklion is a centre for the performing arts.

Sports
The city is home to several sports clubs. Most notably, Heraklion hosts OFI and Ergotelis, two football clubs with earlier presence in the Greek Superleague, the top tier of the Greek football league system. Furthermore, the city is the headquarters of the Heraklion Football Clubs Association, which administers football in the entire region. Other notable sport clubs include Iraklio B.C. (basketball), Atsalenios (football) and Irodotos (football) in the suburbs of Atsalenio and Nea Alikarnassos respectively.

Local TV stations
 Channel 4
 Creta Channel
 Kriti TV
 MyTV

Notable people

Heraklion has been the home town of some of Greece's most significant people, including the novelist Nikos Kazantzakis (best known for Zorba the Greek), the poet and Nobel Prize winner Odysseas Elytis and the world-famous painter Domenicos Theotokopoulos (El Greco).

Literature
 Elli Alexiou (1894–1988) author
 Minás Dimákis (1913–1980) poet
 Odysseas Elytis (1911–1996) Nobel awarded poet
 Tess Fragoulis, Greek-Canadian author
 Rea Galanaki (1947–present) author
 Giritli Ali Aziz Efendi (1749–1798), author and diplomat
 Nikos Kazantzakis (1883–1957) author
  (1911–1997) author and scholar
 Pedro de Candia, (1485–1542) author and travel writer, recorded the Spanish Conquest of the Americas
 Stephanos Sahlikis (1330-after 1391) poet
 Lili Zografou (1922–1998) author

Scientists and academia
 Nicholas Kalliakis (1645–1707) Greek Cretan scholar and philosopher
 Niccolò Comneno Papadopoli (1655–1740) lawyer, historian and librarian
 Andreas Musalus (ca. 1665–1721) Greek Cretan professor of mathematics, philosopher and architectural theorist
 Francesco Barozzi (1537–1604) mathematician and astronomer
 Joseph Solomon Delmedigo (1591-1655) rabbi, author, physician, mathematician and musical theorist
 Fotis Kafatos biologist, President of the European Research Council
 Spyros Kokotos (1933–present) architect
 Marcus Musurus (Markos Mousouros) (1470–1517) scholar and philosopher
 Peter of Candia also known as Antipope Alexander V: philosopher and scholar
 Joseph Sifakis (1946–present) computer scientist, co-recipient of the 2007 Turing Award
 Michael N. Katehakis (1952–present) applied mathematician and operations researcher at Rutgers University
 Gerasimos Vlachos (1607–1685), scholar
 Simone Stratigo (ca. 1733–1824), Greek mathematician and an Nautical science expert, whose family was from Heraklion (Candia)

Painting and sculpture
 Theophanes (ca.1500–1559) painter of icons
 Michael Damaskinos (1530/35-1592/93) painter of icons
 Georgios Klontzas (1535-1608) painter
 El Greco (1541–1614) mannerist painter, sculptor and architect
 Yiannis Parmakelis (1932-), sculptor
 Andreas Ritzos (1422–1492) painter of icons
 Aristidis Vlassis (1947–2015) painter
 Konstantinos Volanakis (1837–1907) painter

Film industry
 Rika Diallina (1934-), actress and model, Miss Hellas
 Ilya Livykou (1919–2002), actress
 Sapfo Notara (1907–1985), actress
 Yannis Smaragdis (1946-), film director

Music
 Rena Kyriakou (1918–1994) pianist
 Francisco Leontaritis (Francesco Londarit) (1518–1572) composer
 Giannis Markopoulos (1939–) composer
Myron Michailidis (1968–)  conductor
 Manolis Rasoulis (1945–2011) lyrics writer
 Notis Sfakianakis (1959–) singer
 Lena Platonos, pianist

Spirituality
 Maria Papapetros - psychic, spiritual healer, spiritual consultant

Sports
 Kyle Hamilton (born 2001), American football player
 Nikos Machlas (born 1973), footballer
 Georgios Samaras (born 1985), footballer
 Greg Massialas (born 1956), American fencer
 Michalis Karlis (born 2003), basketball player
 Giorgos Giakoumakis (Born 1994), footballer

Business
 Constantine Corniaktos (1517–1603) wine merchant and wealthiest man in the Eastern European city of Lviv
 Gianna Angelopoulos-Daskalaki (1955-) business woman, lawyer and politician

Politics and law
 Leonidas Kyrkos (1924–2011), politician
 Aristidis Stergiadis (1861–1950) High Commissioner of Smyrna
 Georgios Voulgarakis (1959-) conservative politician
 Romilos Kedikoglou (1940-) President of the Court of Cassation of Greece

Clergy
 Maximos Margunios (1549–1602), bishop of Cyrigo (Kythira)
 Kyrillos Loukaris (1572–1637) theologian, Pope & Patriarch of Alexandria as Cyril III and Ecumenical Patriarch of Constantinople as Cyril I
 Meletius Pegas, Pope & Patriarch of Alexandria
 Theodore II (1954-) Pope & Patriarch of Alexandria and all Africa
 Peter Phillarges (ca. 1339–1410) (also Pietro Di Candia, later Pope Alexander V)
 Makarios Griniezakis  (1973-) Greek Orthodox Archbishop of the Holy Archdiocese of Australia

Fashion
 Maria Spiridaki (1984) fashion model and television presenter

International relations

Consulates

Twin towns and sister cities
Heraklion is twinned with:
  Limassol, Cyprus
  Constanța, Romania (1992)
  Odesa, Ukraine (1992)
  Toledo, Spain (2017)
  Nizhny Novgorod, Russia (2018)
  Tampa, United States (2019)
  Čukarica, Serbia (2019)
  Ningbo, China (2019)

Location

Gallery

See also
 Centre for Technological Research of Crete
 European Network and Information Security Agency
 Foundation for Research & Technology - Hellas
 Lions Square
 Minoan civilization
 Siege of Candia (1648–1669)
 TEI of Crete

References

External links

 
 Municipality of Heraklion
 Heraklion information
 Heraklion - The Greek National Tourism Organization
 Vikelaia Library
 
Old maps of Heraklion - Eran Laor Cartographic Collection, The National Library of Israel, in Historic Cities

 
824 establishments
Greek prefectural capitals
Greek regional capitals
Municipalities of Crete
Populated places in Heraklion (regional unit)
Populated places established in the 9th century
Mediterranean port cities and towns in Greece
Port cities of the Aegean Sea
Fortified settlements
9th-century establishments in Greece